Sir William Perkins's School Boat Club (SWPSBC) is a rowing club based on the River Thames at Sir William Perkins's School Boathouse, Thameside, Laleham, Surrey.

History
The boat club was founded in 2016 as part of the School's Building Development programme and is owned by Sir William Perkins's School with rowing being a major school sport. The boathouse is located next door to the Burway Rowing Club.

Although it has only been open since 2016 the club has already won three British junior championships.

Honours

British champions

Key
 J junior
 2, 4, 8 crew size
 18, 16, 15, 14 age group
 x sculls
 - coxless
 + coxed

Notable alumni
 Harriet Taylor

See also
Rowing on the River Thames

References

Sport in Surrey
Rowing clubs in England
Rowing clubs of the River Thames
Scholastic rowing in the United Kingdom